Boulevard of Broken Dreams is an American documentary series that aired the E! television network from January 22 to March 12, 2007. The series focuses on stories about celebrities who have struggled with fame, staged major comebacks after falling from grace, or who met untimely ends.

List of episodes
Krissy and Niki Taylor/Leif Garrett
Destiny's Child/Jonathan Brandis
Lauryn Hill/Mitch Hedberg
Asia Carrera/Tommy Morrison
Chris Penn/Tara Correa-McMullen
James Frey/Christine Chubbuck
Tom Sizemore/Troy Duffy
Glenn Quinn/Lil' Kim

Niki Taylor lawsuit
On January 29, 2007, Niki Taylor filed a federal lawsuit charging E! Entertainment with slander and emotional distress for her profile on Boulevard of Broken Dreams. She alleges the producers promised to promote her successes but instead misrepresented her as a failure. "The first episode," the Complaint stated, "... is a false portrayal of Ms. Taylor as being continually plagued by ill fortune and tragedy." The lawsuit indicates the documentary alarmed a cosmetics company with which she was negotiating to start a cosmetics line.

References

External links 
 

2007 American television series debuts
2007 American television series endings
2000s American documentary television series
E! original programming
English-language television shows
Entertainment news shows in the United States